Stefan Studtrucker (born 25 November 1966) is a retired German footballer who spent most of his career at Arminia Bielefeld.

External links
 

1966 births
Living people
German footballers
Association football forwards
VfL Bochum II players
SG Wattenscheid 09 players
Arminia Bielefeld players
KSV Hessen Kassel players
VfB Lübeck players
Bundesliga players
2. Bundesliga players
Association football midfielders